The A632 is a major road in Derbyshire and Nottinghamshire, England. It starts in Matlock  and joins the town with Chesterfield. From there, it goes through Bolsover and then onto the A616 at the village of Cuckney 

Roads in England
Roads in Derbyshire
Transport in Nottinghamshire